John W. "Bake" Baker (August 14, 1907 – February 6, 1979) was an American football player and coach.  He played college football at the University of Southern California, where he was a two-time All-American at guard.  Baker served as the head football coach at Iowa State Teachers College—now known as the University of Northern Iowa—from 1933 to 1934, the University of Denver from 1948 to 1952, and Sacramento State College—now known as California State University, Sacramento—from 1957 to 1960, compiling a career college football coaching record of 41–61–4.  He was inducted into the College Football Hall of Fame as a player in 1983.

Playing career
Baker earned varsity letters at USC in 1929, 1930, and 1931.  He played in the 1930 and the 1932 Rose Bowl, kicking five points after touchdowns. He kicked the winning 33-yard field goal with one minute to go in USC's game against the Notre Dame in 1931. It was USC's first victory in South Bend. Baker was an all-conference first-teamer in 1930 and 1931 and was invited to participate in a demonstration game of American football at the 1932 Summer Olympics, but he declined. At USC, Baker was initiated as a member of Phi Kappa Tau fraternity.

Coaching career
After leaving USC, Baker coached football at Iowa State Teachers College, the University of Omaha, the University of Denver, Sacramento State College, University of Washington, and Sacramento City College.  He was also the athletic director at Sacramento State.

Honors
Baker was inducted into the Fresno County Athletic Hall of Fame in 1961, the College Football Hall of Fame in 1983, the University of Southern California Athletics Hall of Fame in 1997, and the Phi Kappa Tau Hall of Fame in 2006.

Head coaching record

Football

References

External links
 

1907 births
1979 deaths
American football guards
Denver Pioneers football coaches
Los Angeles Dons coaches
March Field Flyers football coaches
Nebraska–Omaha Mavericks football coaches
Omaha Mavericks men's basketball coaches
Northern Iowa Panthers football coaches
Washington Huskies football coaches
Sacramento State Hornets athletic directors
Sacramento State Hornets football coaches
Sportspeople from Fresno County, California
USC Trojans football players
Junior college football coaches in the United States
All-American college football players
College Football Hall of Fame inductees
People from Adair County, Iowa
People from Denison, Iowa
Coaches of American football from California
Players of American football from California
Basketball coaches from California